Federal University of Paraíba (UFPB) is a public university whose main campus is located in the city of João Pessoa, Paraíba, Brazil. Along with Federal University of Campina Grande, they're the main universities in the state of Paraiba, Brazil.

UFPB offers degrees (Bachelor's, Master's and Doctoral) in areas such as the liberal arts (including Law), health sciences (including Medicine and Dentistry), engineering and technology (Computer Science and Computer Engineering), business, education and the fine arts (Music, Theater, Art).

There are also campuses in Areia, Bananeiras and North Coast (Rio Tinto and Mamanguape).

2002 campus detachment 
In 2002 the UFPB, at the time formed by the campuses in João Pessoa, Areia, Campina Grande, Patos, Cajazeiras and Sousa, had four of them detached due to the creation of the Federal University of Campina Grande.

Campuses and Centres 
Campus I - João Pessoa
CBIOTEC - Centre for Biotechnology
CCHLA - Centre for Human Sciences, Letters, and Arts
 CCSA - Centre for Applied Social Sciences
CE - Centre for Education
CCS - Centre for Health Sciences
CCM - Centre for Medical Sciences
CCJ -  Centre for Law Studies
CCEN - Centre for Natural and Exact Sciences
CI - Centre for Informatics
CTDR - Centre for Technology and Regional Development
CEAR - Centre for Alternative and Renewable Energy
Campus II - Areia
Centre for Agrarian Science

Campus III - Bananeiras
Centre for Human, Social, and Agrarian Sciences

Campus IV - Litoral Norte (Rio Tinto e Mamanguape)
Centre for Applied Sciences and Education

See also 
 Brazil University Rankings
 Universities and Higher Education in Brazil

External links 

 

Education in Paraíba
Paraiba
Buildings and structures in Paraíba
Educational institutions established in 1955
1955 establishments in Brazil
Buildings and structures in João Pessoa, Paraíba